Winterland June 1977: The Complete Recordings is a 9 CD live album by the American rock band the Grateful Dead.  It contains three complete concerts.  It was recorded on June 7, 8, and 9, 1977, at the Winterland Ballroom in San Francisco, California.  The album was released on October 1, 2009.

A tenth, "bonus" disc was included with early shipments of the album.  The bonus disc contains material from the May 12, 1977 concert at the Auditorium Theatre in Chicago, Illinois, all of which was later released, with the entire performance, on the May 1977 box set.

Winterland June 1977: The Complete Recordings was the third Grateful Dead album to contain an entire  "run" of concerts.  The first was Fillmore West 1969: The Complete Recordings, which was released in 2005. The second was Winterland 1973: The Complete Recordings, released in 2008.

Recording and mastering
The album was released in HDCD format.  This provides enhanced sound quality when played on CD players with HDCD capability, and is fully compatible with regular CD players.

Track listing

Disc 1
June 7, 1977 — First set:
"Bertha" (Jerry Garcia, Robert Hunter) – 7:34
"Jack Straw" (Bob Weir, Hunter) – 6:19
"Tennessee Jed" (Garcia, Hunter) – 9:25
"Looks Like Rain" (Weir, John Perry Barlow) – 9:05
"Peggy-O" (Traditional) – 10:13
"Funiculi Funicula" (Luigi Denza) – 3:06
"El Paso" (Marty Robbins) – 4:52
"Friend of the Devil" (Garcia, John Dawson, Hunter) – 8:42
"The Music Never Stopped" (Weir, Barlow) – 7:20

Disc 2
June 7, 1977 — Second set:
"Scarlet Begonias" > (Garcia, Hunter) – 10:11
"Fire on the Mountain" > (Mickey Hart, Hunter) – 9:03
"Good Lovin'" > (Artie Resnick, Rudy Clark) – 7:29
"Candyman" (Garcia, Hunter) – 7:24
"Estimated Prophet" > (Weir, Barlow) – 8:48
"He's Gone" > (Garcia, Hunter) – 14:47
"Drums" > (Bill Kreutzmann, Hart) – 3:01

Disc 3
"Samson and Delilah" (Traditional) – 9:30
"Terrapin Station" > (Garcia, Hunter) – 10:51
"(Walk Me Out in the) Morning Dew" > (Bonnie Dobson, Tim Rose) – 13:15
"Around and Around" (Chuck Berry) – 9:14
June 7, 1977 — Encore:
"Uncle John's Band (Garcia, Hunter) – 11:55
"U.S. Blues" (Garcia, Hunter) – 6:07

Disc 4
June 8, 1977 — First set:
"New Minglewood Blues" (Noah Lewis) – 6:22
"Sugaree" (Garcia, Hunter) – 16:46
"Mexicali Blues" (Weir, Barlow) – 3:55
"Row Jimmy" (Garcia, Hunter) – 10:34
"Passenger" (Phil Lesh, Peter Monk) – 3:52
"Sunrise" (Donna Godchaux) – 4:14
"Brown-Eyed Women" (Garcia, Hunter) – 5:47
"It's All Over Now" (Bobby Womack, Shirley Womack) – 8:57
"Jack-A-Roe" (Traditional) – 7:19
"Lazy Lightnin' " > (Weir, Barlow) – 3:24
"Supplication" (Weir, Barlow) – 5:46

Disc 5
June 8, 1977 — Second set:
"Bertha" > (Garcia, Hunter) – 6:53
"Good Lovin'" (Clarke, Resnick) – 6:04
"Ramble On Rose" (Garcia, Hunter) – 8:08
"Estimated Prophet" > (Weir, Barlow) – 9:42
"Eyes of the World" > (Garcia, Hunter) – 19:20
"Drums" > (Kreutzmann, Hart) – 4:05

Disc 6
"The Other One" > (Grateful Dead) – 14:32
"Wharf Rat" > (Garcia, Hunter) – 11:16
"Not Fade Away" > (Buddy Holly, Norman Petty) – 13:44
"Goin' Down the Road Feeling Bad" > (Traditional) – 8:06
"Johnny B. Goode" (Berry) – 4:39
June 8, 1977 — Encore:
"Brokedown Palace" (Garcia, Hunter) – 7:53

Disc 7
June 9, 1977 — First set:
"Mississippi Half-Step Uptown Toodeloo" (Garcia, Hunter) – 11:27
"Jack Straw" (Weir, Hunter) – 6:06
"They Love Each Other" (Garcia, Hunter) – 7:33
"Cassidy" (Weir, Barlow) – 5:41
"Sunrise" (Godchaux) – 4:14
"Deal" (Garcia, Hunter) – 5:48
"Looks Like Rain" (Weir, Barlow) – 9:10
"Loser" (Garcia, Hunter) – 7:40
"The Music Never Stopped" (Weir, Barlow) – 7:44

Disc 8
June 9, 1977 — Second set:
"Samson and Delilah" (Traditional) – 7:39
"Funiculì Funiculà" (Turco, Denza) – 2:25
"Help on the Way" > (Garcia, Hunter) – 5:09
"Slipknot!" > (Garcia, Hunter) – 9:00
"Franklin's Tower" (Garcia, Hunter, Kreutzmann) – 17:29

Disc 9
"Estimated Prophet" > (Weir, Barlow) – 11:36
"St. Stephen" > (Garcia, Lesh, Hunter) – 5:30
"Not Fade Away" > (Holly, Petty) – 6:29
"Drums" > (Kreutzmann, Hart) – 4:22
"St. Stephen" > (Garcia, Lesh, Hunter) – 0:51
"Terrapin Station" > (Garcia, Hunter) – 11:10
"Sugar Magnolia" (Weir, Hunter) – 9:25
June 9, 1977 — Encore:
"U.S. Blues" (Garcia, Hunter) – 6:08
"One More Saturday Night" (Weir) – 5:18

Bonus Disc

Selections from May 12, 1977, Auditorium Theatre, Chicago, Illinois: 
"Mississippi Half-Step Uptown Toodeloo" > (Garcia, Hunter) – 9:59
"Dancing in the Street" (Marvin Gaye, Ivy Jo Hunter, William "Mickey" Stevenson) – 13:56
"Terrapin Station" > (Garcia, Hunter) – 10:25
"Playing in the Band" > (Weir, Hart, Hunter) – 8:18
"Drums" > (Kreutzmann, Hart) – 4:09
"Not Fade Away" > (Holly, Petty) – 14:11
"Comes a Time" > (Garcia, Hunter) – 10:19
"Playing in the Band" (Weir, Hart, Hunter) – 6:50

Personnel

Grateful Dead
 Jerry Garcia – lead guitar, vocals
 Donna Godchaux – vocals
 Keith Godchaux – keyboards
 Mickey Hart - drums
 Bill Kreutzmann – drums
 Phil Lesh – electric bass
 Bob Weir – rhythm guitar, vocals

Production
Box set produced by David Lemieux
Recording by Betty Cantor-Jackson
CD mastering by Jeffrey Norman at Garage Audio Mastering, Petaluma, CA
Original 2-track master speed and time base correction by Jamie Howarth, Plangent Processes
Cover art by Emek
Uncle Sam art by Gary Gutierrez
Photography by Bruce Polonsky and Ed Perlstein
Booklet essay by David Fricke
Art direction and design by Steve Vance
Special thanks to Mike Johnson, John Chester, Christine Bunting

May 12, 1977 set list
The set list for the May 12, 1977 concert at the Chicago Auditorium Theater was:
First set: "Bertha", "Me and My Uncle", "Tennessee Jed", "Cassidy", "Peggy-O", "Jack Straw", "They Love Each Other", "New Minglewood Blues", "Mississippi Half-Step Uptown Toodeloo"*, "Dancin' in the Streets"*
Second set: "Samson & Delilah", "Brown-Eyed Women", "Estimated Prophet", "Sunrise", "Terrapin Station"*, "Playing in the Band"*, "Drums"*, "Not Fade Away"*, "Comes A Time"*, "Playing in the Band"*
Encore: "Johnny B. Goode"
* Included in the Winterland June 1977 bonus disc

Notes

Grateful Dead live albums
2009 live albums
Grateful Dead Records live albums